Jarek is a Slavic male given name. It can be a nickname for the Polish name Jarosław. Notable people with this name include:

 Jarek Broussard, American American football player
 Jarek Dymek (born 1971), Polish strongman competitor
 Jarek Goebel (born 1985), New Zealand Rugby player
 Jarek Hardy, Canadian musician with The Johnstones
 Jarek Kasar (born 1983), Estonian singer
 Jarek Kolář (born 1977), Czech video game designer and producer
 Jarek Kupsc (born 1966), Polish-American film director and screen writer
 Jarek Lancaster (born 1990), American American football player
 Jarek Molski, American disability rights campaigner
 Jarek Nohavica or Jaromír Nohavica, Czech musician and poet
 Jarek Pozarycki, Polish musician with Elgibbor
 Jarek Srnensky (born 1963), Swiss tennis player
 Jarek Śmietana (1951–2013), Polish jazz musician
Fictional characters
 Jarek, Mortal Kombat character

See also 
 Engelbert Jarek (1935–2017), Polish football player

Polish masculine given names